The Gaditano Pouter is a breed of fancy pigeon developed over many years of selective breeding. Gaditano Pouters, along with other varieties of domesticated pigeons, are all descendants of the rock dove (Columba livia).

See also

List of pigeon breeds

References

Pigeon breeds
Pigeon breeds originating in Spain